The Naked and Famous are a New Zealand indie electronic band from Auckland, formed in 2007. The band currently consists of Alisa Xayalith (vocals, keyboards) and Thom Powers (vocals, guitars).

The band has released four studio albums: Passive Me, Aggressive You (2010), In Rolling Waves (2013), Simple Forms (2016) and Recover (2020). Since 2012, the band has been based in Los Angeles, California.

History
Xayalith (born 1986 in Auckland) is the daughter of Laotian refugees and was raised together with a younger brother. Her father introduced her to his native folk music and, at the age of 13, she taught herself guitar. Powers had been playing in local bands from an early age after he had been taught to play guitar by his father.

2007–2008: Early years
The band formed in 2007 when Powers and Xayalith were working on what became two extended plays—This Machine and No Light—that they recorded with engineer Aaron Short, a fellow student at Auckland's Music and Audio Institute of New Zealand. The EPs were subsequently released on local independent label Round Trip Mars. Powers and Xayalith began performing live with Ben Knapp and Jordan Clark on bass and drums respectively, while Aaron Short became a performing member of the group. Knapp and Clark left the group in 2009 and were subsequently replaced with Jesse Wood and David Beadle.

2009–2011: Passive Me, Aggressive You

After recording "All of This", the group then set about recording the single "Young Blood" and their debut album, recording mostly at home and at Auckland studio The Lab. "Young Blood" debuted on the New Zealand chart at number one on 14 June 2010—the first New Zealand artist in three years to do so. The Naked and Famous released their debut studio album, Passive Me, Aggressive You, on 6 September 2010 on their own label, Somewhat Damaged. The album was produced by Thom Powers and Aaron Short, and mixed by Billy Bush.

On 6 December 2010, the BBC announced that The Naked and Famous had been nominated for BBC's Sound of 2011 poll.

In 2011, the band garnered six nominations at the New Zealand Music Awards for Album of the Year, Single of the Year, Best Group, Breakthrough Artist of the Year, Best Alternative Album and the People's Choice Award. They were also nominated for the NZ On Air Best Music Video and won the MAINZ Best Engineer Award and its Best Producer Award.

2012–2013: In Rolling Waves
The band settled in Los Angeles in mid-2012 after completing touring for Passive Me, Aggressive You. They had performed over 200 shows in 24 countries between 2010 and 2012. Sharing a home over the back of Laurel Canyon, they began work on writing and demoing their second album. They intended to record an album that could be played live, not relying on backing tracks—something the group had always eschewed.

On 28 February 2013, the band announced One Temporary Escape, a concert film recorded at The Warfield in San Francisco in 2012. It was released for free download on 18 March 2013.

Entering Los Angeles' Sunset Sound studio in March 2013 with engineer Billy Bush (who had mixed the previous album), they began the process of recording In Rolling Waves. The album sessions were completed in a month and then in June 2013, The Naked and Famous headed for London where Alan Moulder spent a month mixing the album at his Willesden studio, Assault and Battery. The album was mastered at Sterling Sound in New York by Joe LaPorta, who had also mastered Passive Me, Aggressive You, and was produced by Thom Powers with Aaron Short. Justin Meldal-Johnsen co-produced two tracks with Powers.

On 23 July 2013, the band revealed their new single "Hearts Like Ours" along with the release date for their second studio album In Rolling Waves, on 16 September 2013 in the UK.

2014–present: Simple Forms,  Recover  and Xayalith solo career 
The Naked and Famous performed at Coachella in 2014. On 20 November 2014, the band announced that they had begun working on a third album. The band began tracking for the album in September 2015. In March 2016, they performed at the Wanderland Music and Arts Festival in Manila.

On 3 July 2016, the band announced their new single "Higher" would be released on 7 July. Upon the single's release, the band revealed that their third studio album, Simple Forms, was set to be released on 14 October 2016 via their label Somewhat Damaged in conjunction with Kobalt Label Services. On 24 August 2016, they released another single titled "Laid Low". The album was recorded at Powers' Echo Park studio and released as per the announcement.

In February 2017, it was announced that the band would perform as opening acts, alongside Wavves, in Blink-182's 2017 spring tour which would visit mostly the southern United States.

The band released an acoustic compilation album titled A Still Heart on 9 March 2018, at which time they indicated that they were working on their fourth studio album. That same month, it was announced that founding member Aaron Short and Jesse Wood had departed the band. Following their departure, Luna Shadows joined the band on piano. The group released A Still Heart (Live) on 8 June 2018.

Sometime before March 2020, the group parted ways with Beadle and Shadows.

In April 2020, the band announced that Recover, their fourth studio album, would be released on 24 July 2020.

Xayalith solo career 
In late 2021, lead vocalist Alisa Xayalith broadcast a tune called "High Fidelity", the debut song from the singer's forthcoming EP.

Name
The Naked and Famous took their name from English musician Tricky's song "Tricky Kid", which expressed ambivalence about the notion of celebrity. In the song, Tricky quotes the line "everybody wants to be naked and famous", from The Presidents of the United States of America's song "Naked and Famous".

Band members

Current
 Alisa Xayalith – vocals, keyboards 
 Thom Powers – vocals, guitars 

Former
 Ben Knapp – bass 
 Jordan Clark – drums 
 Jesse Wood – drums 
 Aaron Short – keyboards 
 Luna Shadows - keyboards 
 David Beadle – bass 

Timeline

Discography

 Passive Me, Aggressive You (2010)
 In Rolling Waves (2013)
 Simple Forms (2016)
 Recover (2020)

Awards and nominations

References

External links

 

2007 establishments in New Zealand
APRA Award winners
New Zealand electronic rock musical groups
Fiction Records artists
Indietronica music groups
Island Records artists
Musical groups established in 2007
Musical groups from Auckland
Musical quartets
New Zealand electronic music groups
New Zealand indie rock groups
New Zealand new wave musical groups
Noise pop musical groups
Post-punk revival music groups
New Zealand synthpop groups